Values education is the process by which people give moral values to each other. According to Powney et al. It can be an activity that can take place in any human organisation. During which people are assisted by others, who may be older, in a condition experienced to make explicit our ethics in order to assess the effectiveness of these values and associated behaviour for their own and others' long term well-being, and to reflect on and acquire other values and behaviour which they recognise as being more effective for long term well-being of self and others. There is a difference between literacy and education.

There has been very little reliable research on the results of values education classes, but there are some encouraging preliminary results.

One definition refers to it as the process that gives young people an initiation into values, giving knowledge of the rules needed to function in this mode of relating to other people and to seek the development in the student a grasp of certain underlying principles, together with the ability to apply these rules intelligently, and to have the settled disposition to do so Some researchers use the concept values education as an umbrella of concepts that includes moral education and citizenship education Themes that values education can address to varying degrees are character, moral development, Religious Education, Spiritual development, citizenship education, personal development, social development and cultural development.

There is a further distinction between explicit values education and implicit values education where:
 explicit values education is associated with those different pedagogies, methods or programmes that teachers or educators use in order to create learning experiences for students when it comes to value questions.

Another definition of value education is "learning about self and wisdom of life" in a self-exploratory, systematic and scientific way through formal education. According to C.V.Good'value education is the aggregate of all the process by means of which a person develops abilities and other forms of behaviour of the positive values in the society in which he lives.

Commonality in many "educations"
Moral education
Morals as socio-legal-religious norms are supposed to help people behave responsibly. However, not all morals lead to responsible behaviour. Values education can show which morals are "bad" morals and which are "good". The change in behaviour comes from confusing questions about right and wrong.

American psychologist Lawrence Kohlberg who specialized in research on moral education and reasoning, and
was best known for his theory of stages of moral development, believed children needed to be in an environment that allowed for open and public discussion of day-to-day conflicts and problems to develop their moral reasoning ability.

 Teacher education
Cross has made a start at documenting some teacher training attempts.

Multinational school-based values education schemes

Living Values Education Programme
This project of worldwide proportions inspired by the new religious movement called the Brahma Kumaris World Spiritual University incorporates twelve values (unity, peace, happiness, hope, humility, simplicity, trust, freedom, co-operation, honesty, courage, love), and has formed the basis of the whole-school ethos approach in schools such as West Kidlington Primary School, Kidlington whose head master Neil Hawkes and Values education coordinators Linda Heppenstall used the work and other programmes to help them form a values-based school. The Living Values Education Programme website lists 54 countries where values education projects are undertaken.

Human Values Foundation
The Human Values Foundation was established in 1995 to make available worldwide, a comprehensive values-themed programme for children from 4 to 12 years entitled "Education in Human Values".  Its fully resourced lesson plans utilise familiar teaching techniques of discussion, story-telling, quotations, group singing, activities to reinforce learning and times of quiet reflection.  Following the success of "EHV", a second programme was published – Social and Emotional Education ("SEE"), primarily for ages 12 to 14+ but it has also proved constructive for older children identified as likely to benefit from help getting their lives 'back on track.  The programmes enable children and young people to explore and put into practice a wide spectrum of values with the potential to enrich their lives.  Through experiential learning, over time participants develop a well-considered personal morality, all the while gaining invaluable emotional and social skills to help them lead happy, fulfilled, successful lives.

Character education

Character education is an umbrella term generally used to describe the teaching of children in a manner that will help them develop as personal and social beings. However, this definition requires research to explain what is meant by "personal and social being". Concepts that fall under this term include social and emotional learning, moral reasoning/cognitive development, life skills education, health education; violence prevention, critical thinking, ethical reasoning, and conflict resolution and mediation. Lickona (1996) mentions eleven principles of successful character education. It seems to have been applied in the UK and the United States

Science of Living
Science of Living (Jeevan Vigyan; Jeevan = Life and Vigyan = Science) is a detailed program that complements the current educational approach with spiritual and value-based learning. While both mental and physical development is needed for a student's growth, Jeevan Vigyan adds a third pillar – that of emotional intelligence and morality (or values) – to education in schools and colleges. A combination of theory and practice, Jeevan Vigyan draws on the findings of various life sciences as well as nutritional sciences. Our parasympathetic nervous system and endocrinal system are known to be the drivers of our emotions and our behaviour. These biological centres can be influenced the Science of Living through a system of yogic exercises, breathing exercises, meditation and contemplation. Science of Living's source of inspiration is Jain Acharya Ganadhipati Shri Tulsi (1914–1997). His thoughts were further developed and expanded by Acharya Shri Mahapragya (1920–2010). Currently, Muni Shri Kishan Lal Ji, under the leadership of Acharya Shri Mahashraman, is the Principal of SOL.

Examples of values education from around the world
Taylor gives a thorough overview of values education in 26 European countries.

Australia
The Australian Government currently funds Values education in its schools, with its own publications and funding of school forums on values education at all levels of education. It also helps in becoming a better person. A conference on "Moral Education and Australian Values" was held in 2007 at Monash University.

India
The Indian Government currently promote Values education in its schools. The Ministry of Human Resource Development has taken a strong step to introduce values among schools and teachers training centres.

Indonesia
A key feature of education in Indonesia is the five principles of Pancasila.

Japan
Elementary school and middle school students from first to ninth grades will be taught the importance of life, to listen to others with different opinions, to be fair, respect their country and learn about foreign cultures.

Singapore
Teacher training institutions in Singapore all have curricular for learning to teach civics and moral education programmes – but students do not take these as seriously as they should due to lack of assessment. The reason has been said to be the lack of innovative teaching approaches such as discourse pedagogy.

Slovenia
There is an obligatory school subject that includes the aspect of values education and Citizenship Culture and Ethics. It is taught in 7th or 8th grade of primary school. Besides this, there are two elective subjects that partly deal with values education: Religions and Ethics (for 7th, 8th, and 9th grade) and Philosophy for children (Critical thinking, Ethical exploring, Me and the other; for 7th, 8th, and 9th grade). The Slovenian educational system does not require special training in the field of values education for teachers that teach mentioned subjects.

Sweden
Values education is a part of Swedish schools. Whereas the formal curricula are about educating students to be competent democratic citizens by practising student participation, qualitative studies have shown that in everyday school life, values education and school democracy often appeared to be reduced to traditional disciplining with a high focus on rules and regulations. This in turn evokes some critiques among students. Most research on values education in Sweden is done by qualitative methods, especially ethnographic or field studies as well as a focus group and interview studies. Some studies have been conducted by survey and other quantitative methods. In addition, theoretical work with roots in Dewey and Habermas has been done on deliberative democracy and deliberative conversations in schools.

Thailand
In Thailand, values have traditionally been taught within the context of Buddhist religious education. Since 1982 there has been a revival of applied values as an extracurricular activity suitable for Buddhist, Moslem and Christian students alike to prepare Thai students for the effects of globalization.

United Kingdom
Since 1988 the British government, although not recognising or calling it values education, has promoted and respected values in the guise of spiritual, moral, social and cultural development (SMSCD) leaving the initiative to individual schools to decide how values education standards should be met. It is not clear whether there are standards of values education.

The Government and state school systems have never called it "values education". Values education courses in Britain may be implemented in the form of government-supported campaigns such as Social & Emotional Aspects of Learning (SEAL, but are more often provided by local experts in the form of Living Values Education Programme.

One headteacher in Cornwall has achieved national recognition for his work on character development and "virtues", at Kehelland Village School, based on Baha'i teachings. He was asked to develop the primary section of the University of Birmingham's Character Education pack for use with the national curriculum.

See also
 Democratic education
 Educational psychology
 Emotional and behavioral disorders
 Ethics
 Holistic education
 Moral psychology
 Political philosophy
 Preschool
 Social psychology
 Socialization
 Society for Values in Higher Education
 Sociology
 Special education
 Value (ethics)

References

Educational programs

External links
 Philosophy of Value-Oriente Education - i
 Philosophy of Value-Oriented Education – ii
 Philosophy of value-oriented education– iii